Please Do Not Disturb is an EP recording by Juliana Hatfield, released in 1997 (see 1997 in music).

Track listing
all songs by Juliana Hatfield
"Sellout" - 3:58
"Trying Not to Think About It" - 3:03
"As If Your Life Depended on It" - 4:50
"Give Me Some of That" - 3:04
"Get Off" - 4:07
"The Edge of Nowhere" - 3:25

Personnel
Juliana Hatfield - vocals, guitar, keyboard, bass (track 5)
Mikey Welsh - bass
Todd Phillips - drums, percussion, guitar (track 2)
Mike Leahy - guitar (track 3)
Ed Slanker - guitar (track 4)
Tim O'Heir - synthesizer
Duke Roth - cello

Production
 Wally Gagel –	Engineer
 Jim Goldberg – Photography

References

Juliana Hatfield albums
1997 EPs